Jack Zouhary (born December 18, 1951) is a senior United States district judge of the United States District Court for the Northern District of Ohio.

Education and career

Zouhary was born in 1951 and raised in Toledo, Ohio as the son of Lebanese immigrants. He received a Bachelor of Arts degree from Dartmouth College in 1973. He received a Juris Doctor from the University of Toledo College of Law in 1976. He was in private practice in Toledo, Ohio from 2004 to 2005 with the law firm of Fuller & Henry and Robison, Curphey & O'Connell from 1976 to 1999. He was Senior Vice President and General Counsel, S.E. Johnson Companies, Inc. from 2000 to 2003. He was briefly a judge on the Lucas County Court of Common Pleas from 2005 to 2006.  Governor Bob Taft appointed Zouhary to the Court of Common Pleas after Zouhary ran unsuccessfully in 2004.

Federal judicial service

Zouhary was nominated by President George W. Bush on December 14, 2005, to a seat vacated by David A. Katz, upon the recommendation of Senators Mike DeWine and George Voinovich. He was confirmed 96-0 by the United States Senate on March 16, 2006, and he received his commission on March 28, 2006. Since that time, his involvement with a prisoner re-entry program has received media attention. He assumed senior status on July 1, 2019.

References

Sources
 

1951 births
Living people
21st-century American judges
American people of Lebanese descent
Dartmouth College alumni
Ohio state court judges
Judges of the United States District Court for the Northern District of Ohio
Lawyers from Toledo, Ohio
United States district court judges appointed by George W. Bush
University of Toledo College of Law alumni